The Roman Catholic Archdiocese of Bucharest is the Latin Metropolitan archdiocese in Romania.

Its cathedral episcopal see is Bucharest. Ioan Robu was the archbishop from 1990 until his retirement on 21 November 2019. He previously Apostolic Administrator since 25 October 1984. He was succeeded by Aurel Percă. Prior to his appointment, he was served as auxiliary bishop of Iaşi.
.

History 
It was established on 27 April 1883. There had been a Catholic presence in the city since at least the 18th century, but only in 1847 Bishop Josephus Molajoni was able to establish his residence there. His successor, Angelus Parsi, restored the episcopal palace, which had been destroyed by fire in 1847, and in 1852 brought to Bucharest the English Ladies, and in 1861 the Brothers of the Christian Schools. In 1863 Bishop Parsi was succeeded by Josephus Pluym, from 1869 Patriarchal Vicar of Constantinople, who in turn was followed by Ignatius Paoli.
 
After the establishment of the Kingdom of Romania in 1881, a movement was initiated by the government to release the Catholic subjects from dependence on a foreign bishop, and negotiations were begun with Rome. Two years later,  Pope Leo XIII raised the Apostolic Vicariate of Wallachia to an archdiocese, with Bucharest as residence, which was exempt, i.e. directly subordinate to the Vatican.

Extent 
It comprises 91,120 square kilometers (35,195 Square Miles). In addition to national capital Bucharest, the archdiocese covers the rest of Wallachia (Oltenia, Muntenia and Dobruja)—the counties of Mehedinți, Gorj, Dolj, Vâlcea, Olt, Argeș, Teleorman, Dâmbovița, Giurgiu, Prahova, Ilfov, Buzău, Ialomița, Călărași, Brăila, Tulcea and Constanța, of which 0.9% are Roman Catholic, with the largest number of parishes in Bucharest. Its adherents are predominantly Romanian.

Province 
Its ecclesiastical province comprises the Metropolitan's own Archdiocese and the following suffragans :
 Roman Catholic Diocese of Iași
 Roman Catholic Diocese of Oradea Mare
 Roman Catholic Diocese of Satu Mare
 Roman Catholic Diocese of Timișoara

See also 
 Romanian Catholic Eparchy of Saint Basil the Great of Bucharest (Byzantine Rite)
 History of Christianity in Romania

Sources and external links

  Official site
 CatolicHierarchy, with demographic and clerical statistics

Bucharest
1883 establishments in Romania